Caryocolum abhorrens is a moth of the family Gelechiidae. It is found in Afghanistan.

The length of the forewings is about 5 mm. The forewings are blackish mottled with grey with indistinct whitish markings mottled with grey. Adults have been recorded on wing at the end of June.

References

Moths described in 1988
abhorrens
Moths of Asia